Hosta × tardiva is a hybrid species of shade-tolerant foliage plants in the genus Hosta. It is a hybrid of H. kikutii and H. sieboldii.

References

cathayana